24 Hours to Midnight is a 1985 action film directed by Leo Fong and starring Juan Chapa, Stephen Moore, Stack Pierce, Bernie Pock, De'Ann Power and Cynthia Rothrock. It is about a woman who takes revenge on the people that killed her husband.

Background
Apparently Cynthia Rothrock pulled out of the film and the footage with her was shelved for some years. Later scenes with Deanne Powers dressed in a ninja suit were added. The book, The Encyclopedia of Martial Arts Movies by Bill Palmer, Karen Palmer, and Ric Meyers credit George Chung as the director, while other sources credit Leo Fong as the film's director. The production company was Sunny Film Corp.

Releases
Due to the success of the film in video stores, the video rights were acquired by Buena Vista Home Entertainment and ten years later it was re-released. Around 2004, it was re-released through a new company called Draculina Cine. The film's 4th re-release on video was by distributor, Lions Gate.

Story
Devon Grady's husband is killed by gang henchmen. Grady (played by Cynthia Rothrock) goes on a mission of revenge on his killers using her ninja skills. She fights her way to get to the evil villain "White Powder Chan (played by Stack Pierce). While taking  her revenge she is being stalked by two police officers who are trying to get to the bottom of who is making the mayhem. The cops, Lee Ann Jackson and Lester McQueen were played by Myra, and Bernie Pock.

Cast
 Juan Chapa as Harry Grady
 Leo T. Fong as 'Mr. Big'
 Stephen Moore
 Myra as LeAnn Jackson 
 Stack Pierce as 'White Powder' Chan 
 Bernie Pock as Lester McQueen 
 De'Ann Power as Chan's Girlfriend / Woman In Ninja Suit (as Deanne Power)
 Steve Quimby as Roland Stokes 
 Cynthia Rothrock as Devon Grady 
 Rick Scott as West
 Brinke Stevens as Devon Grady (voice)
 Joseph Torres Jr. as Hernandez 
 Freddy Waff as Gang Member

References

External links
 
 
 24 Hours to Midnight at 90 Lost Minutes
 24 Hours to Midnight at Cool Target
 

1985 films
1985 action films
American action films
American independent films
1985 martial arts films
American martial arts films
Films directed by Leo Fong
1985 independent films
1980s English-language films
1980s American films